Isaac Levi (June 30, 1930 – December 25, 2018) was an American philosopher who served as the John Dewey Professor of Philosophy at Columbia University. He is noted for his work in epistemology and decision theory.

Education and career

Levi was one of several doctoral students of Ernest Nagel at Columbia University who were influential in American post-war philosophy; others were Morton White, Patrick Suppes, and Henry E. Kyburg, Jr. Levi taught at Case Western Reserve University before joining the Columbia faculty in 1970. He was elected in 1986 to the American Academy of Arts and Sciences.

Levi also served as doctoral advisor to prominent formal philosophers, including Horacio Arló-Costa and Teddy Seidenfeld, and acted as a mentor to Cheryl Misak during her year at Columbia. There was a debate between Kyburg and Levi on topics in what has come to be known as formal epistemology.

Philosophical work

Levi first made a name for himself with his first book, Gambling with Truth. In the text Levi offered a decision theoretic reconstruction of epistemology with a close-eye towards the classical pragmatist philosophers like William James and Charles Sanders Peirce. Levi was known for his work in belief revision and imprecise probability.

Major publications

Books 
  Originally issued by Knopf (1967).

Chapters in books

See also
 American philosophy
 List of American philosophers

References

1930 births
2018 deaths
American philosophers
Belief revision